Portishead may refer to:

 Portishead (band), a British band
 Portishead (album), the 1997 album by Portishead
 Portishead, Somerset, a coastal town in North Somerset, England
Portishead power station
Portishead railway, a branch line closed in 1981
Portishead railway station, a former station
Portishead Town F.C.
Portishead Radio, a maritime radio communications station based in Burnham-on-Sea, Somerset, England